Paraproctis is a genus of moths in the subfamily Lymantriinae. The genus was erected by George Thomas Bethune-Baker in 1911.

Species
Paraproctis osiris Bethune-Baker, 1911 western Africa
Paraproctis calamolopha Collenette, 1936 Uganda
Paraproctis chionopeza Collenette, 1954 Zimbabwe
Paraproctis coulsoni Collenette, 1954 Kenya

References

Lymantriinae